Bakauheni-Bandar Lampung-Terbanggi Besar Toll Road or Bakter Toll Road is a 140.9 kilometers long toll road that connects Bakauheni Port to Terbanggi Besar in Lampung, Indonesia.
This toll road is part of a Trans-Sumatra Toll Road. The inauguration of the construction of the toll road was carried out on 30 April 2015 by President of Indonesia Joko Widodo. This toll road consists of two lanes in each direction, which has nine interchanges.

Sections
Section 1: Bakauheni-Sidomulyo (39 km)
Section 2: Sidomulyo-Kotabaru (40 km)
Section 3: Kotabaru-Metro (30 km)
Section 4: Metro-Terbanggi Besar

Progress 
 Bakauheni–Terbanggi Besar, on January 5, 2018, predicted daily traffic is 16,097 vehicles/day:
 Section 1: Bakauheni-Sidomulyo, 39.4 kilometers length, on January 21, 2018, 9 kilometers from Port to Bakauheni Interchange has been operated
 Section 2: Sidomulyo-Kotabaru, 40.6 kilometers length, on January 21, 2018, 5 kilometers from Lematang Interchange to Kota Baru Interchange has been operated. The rest of Section 2, Section 3 and Section 4 have been operated on March 8, 2019.
 Section 3: Kotabaru-Metro, 29.0 kilometers length.
 Section 4: Metro-Terbanggi Besar, 31.9 kilometers length.

Toll gates
This toll road consists of several toll gates: 
Bakauheni Selatan (Port): 5 Booths
Bakauheni Utara (Penengahan): 4 Booths
Kalianda: 4 Booths
Sidomulyo: 4 Booths
Lematang: 6 Booths
Kotabaru: 4 Booths
Natar: 6 Booths
Tegineneng Barat (Masgar): 4 Booths
Tegineneng Timur (Metro): 4 Booths
Gunung Sugih: 4 Booths
Terbanggi Besar: 4 Booths

See also

Trans-Sumatra Toll Road

References

Toll roads in Sumatra
Transport in Lampung